Deepak Singh is an Indian film producer and writer who predominantly works in Hindi films.

Career 
Deepak singh started his career as a Brand consultant and Films Marketing and Promotions agent. He has done  Promotion of more than 800 films in Hindi and English in his career. He worked as a production controller for the films Apaharan and then Mumbai Cutting. In 2018, he produced the Bollywood film Soorma starring Diljit Dosanjh and Taapsee Pannu, based on the life of hockey player Sandeep Singh. In the same year he produced Tiger, an American sports drama film based on the subject of human rights, starring Mickey Rourke and Janel Parrish. In 2021, Deepak Singh co-produced Bad President based on the life of Donald Trump, associating with Young & Free Films LA.

In 2022, he has  written, directed and produced a content-based short film 'Rakshaday Everyday'. Deepak Singh also wrote a book "Bravo Yadav" on the life of Honorary Captain Subedar Yogendra Singh Yadav, India’s youngest Param Vir Chakra recipient. He is also about to produce and release this film in 2023. He is also about to produce a biopic on the life of Kiran Dembla.

The American University presented Deepak Singh with a Doctorate degree in Mass Media Communications in recognition of his contributions to the sector.

Filmography

Bibliography 
"BRAVO YADAV(Journey of Honorary Captain Subedar Yogendra Singh Yadav India's Youngest Param Vir Chakra Recipient", 2022, p:178,

References

External links 
 

Indian film producers
People from Lucknow
1973 births
Living people